Acronicta vinnula, the delightful dagger moth, is a moth of the family Noctuidae. It is found from Nova Scotia to Florida, west to Texas, north to Wisconsin and Ontario.

The wingspan is 28–32 mm. Adults are on wing from April to August depending on the location. There are at least two generations per year.

The larvae feed on the leaves of elm.

Subspecies
These subspecies belong to the species Acronicta vinnula:
 Acronicta vinnula vinnula
 Acronicta vinnula paupercula Grote, 1874
 Acronicta vinnula floridensis

References

vinnula
Moths of North America
Moths described in 1864